Elections for the sixth Knesset were held in Israel on 2 November 1965.  Voter turnout was 85.9%.

Background

Prior to the elections, two major alliances were formed; Mapai and Ahdut HaAvoda united to form the Alignment, whilst Herut and the Liberal Party had formed the Gahal alliance towards the end of the previous Knesset session. However, both Mapai and the Liberal Party had been hit by breakaway factions, the Ben-Gurion led Rafi and the Independent Liberals (largely composed of former Progressive Party members) respectively.

The communist Maki had also experienced a split earlier in the year, with most of its Arab members and some Jewish members breaking away to establish Rakah.

A new Mapai-affiliated Arab party, Cooperation and Brotherhood was formed to contest the election, whilst the Arab Socialist List was prevented from running by the Central Elections Committee due to its links with the banned al-Ard organisation. Peace activist Abie Nathan entered a party list, Nes.

Parliament factions

The table below lists the parliamentary factions represented in the 6th Knesset.

Results

Aftermath

The sixth Knesset started with Levi Eshkol's Alignment forming the thirteenth government on 12 January 1966. His coalition included the National Religious Party, Mapam, the Independent Liberals, Poalei Agudat Yisrael, Progress and Development and Cooperation and Brotherhood, and had eighteen ministers. Kadish Luz of the Alignment retained his position as Knesset Speaker. At the end of August, 1966 the new Knesset at Givat Ram in Jerusalem was opened. When the Six-Day War broke out on 5 June 1967, Gahal and Rafi joined the coalition to form a national unity government with 21 ministers. The government was ended by Eshkol's death on 26 February 1969.

Golda Meir of the Alignment formed the fourteenth government, also a national unity government, on 17 March 1969. The coalition partners were Gahal, the National Religious Party, the Independent Liberals, Progress and Development and Cooperation and Brotherhood.

In 1968 Rafi, Mapai and Ahdut HaAvoda merged into the Labor Party in 1968, although David Ben-Gurion (Rafi) became an independent. In 1969 the Labor Party formed an alliance with Mapam also named the Alignment. The new Alignment held 63 seats, the only time a single faction has ever held a majority in the Knesset. Other affiliation changes during the Knesset term included Yizhar Harari leaving the Independent Liberals to join the Alignment, four MKs breaking away from Gahal to establish the Free Centre and Progress and Development and Cooperation and Brotherhood merging to form Cooperation and Development (which then broke up into the two original parties, the Druze Party and Jewish-Arab Brotherhood, each with a single seat).

References

External links
Historical overview of the Sixth Knesset Knesset website
Election results on the Knesset website
The Sixth Knesset on the Knesset website

1965 elections in Israel
Legislative election
Legislative elections in Israel
November 1965 events in Asia
Israel